Syndecan-2 is a protein that in humans is encoded by the SDC2 gene.

Function 

The protein encoded by this gene is a transmembrane (type I) heparan sulfate proteoglycan and is a member of the syndecan proteoglycan family. The syndecans mediate cell binding, cell signaling, and cytoskeletal organization and syndecan receptors are required for internalization of the HIV-1 tat protein. The syndecan-2 protein functions as an integral membrane protein and participates in cell proliferation, cell migration and cell-matrix interactions via its receptor for extracellular matrix proteins. Altered syndecan-2 expression has been detected in several different tumor types.

Interactions 

SDC2 has been shown to interact with:
 CASK,
 Laminin, alpha 3,  and
 EZR

References

Further reading